IVI (ivi.ru) is a Russian online video streaming service which offers licensed video content, including over 65,000 titles of movies, TV shows, cartoons and music videos. 

ivi.ru offers licensed content from all major content producers, including Mosfilm, Lenfilm, Paradise, CTC Media, Gorky Film Studio, Warner Brothers/ Warner Music, Paramount Pictures, 20th Century Fox, Sony Pictures/Sony Music, NBC Universal/Universal Music, Disney, BBC, National Geographic, Central Partnership and much more. ivi.ru’s streaming service is available only to users in Russia due to licensing restrictions.

ivi.ru is available on a wide range of devices, including cellphones and tablets, running all popular operating systems (iOS, Android, Windows Phone, Symbian, Bada), as well as the Smart TVs from all of the main manufacturers (Samsung, LG, Philips, Panasonic, and more.).

History
ivi.ru was launched on February 26, 2010 and attracted more than 180,000 users on the first day, making it one of the most successful start-ups among Russian Internet companies. At the time, ivi.ru was owned by founder Oleg Tumanov and Leonid Boguslavsky's company ru-Net. In 2010, Vladimir Potanin's media holding ProfMedia was brought as a financial investor. ivi.ru raised more money in 2011 from the international technology investment fund Tiger Global Management.

In 2012, the streaming service raised $40 million in another round of funding. The investment was attracted from Baring Vostok, a private equity firm, along with existing investors ru-Net, Tiger Group, ProfMedia and Frontier Ventures. The funds are used to build out the company's technology, as well as its content catalogue.

Services
ivi.ru is a fast-growing internet company, which currently operates three online video streaming services: ivi.ru, deti.ivi.ru, music.ivi.ru:    
 ivi.ru is an online video streaming service offering access to licensed movies, TV series and other video content. A user can watch videos through user-friendly media player.  
 music.ivi.ru, launched on October 4, 2010, is an online video streaming service, which allows users to create customised music and video playlists from the library of more than 28,000 titles based on their preferences.
 deti.ivi.ru, launched on October 20, 2012, is a unique online video streaming service for kids, which offers more than 9,000 cartoons and movies free of charge. The service is child-friendly, protecting young users from exposure to inappropriate content.

Content
ivi.ru offers more than 65,000 content items, including movies, TV shows, cartoons and music videos, making it the largest online library of licensed content in Russia with more than 19 million unique visitors monthly.

ivi.ru discourages the proliferation of illegal video and music content amongst Russian Internet users by promoting and offering high quality and easily accessible licensed videos without malware.

97% of content on ivi.ru’s website is free of charge and can be accessed without registration, while the remaining 3% represents the latest movie premiers and the best titles from majors’ catalogues that can be viewed by subscribing to a premium ivi+ service.

In 2012, ivi.ru became the first online video service in Europe streaming licensed content from all major Hollywood content producers.

Devices
Users can access content through multiple mobile platforms, including Android, iOS, Windows Phone, Bada, Symbian and Smart TVs applications for LG, Samsung, Philips, Toshiba, Sony and Panasonic. ivi.ru’s application is pre-installed on STBs as well as devices by Fly, Sony, Acer, Rover Computers, iconBIT, Rolsen, Qumo, inch, PocketBook, Supra, Lexand. ivi.ru was also available on Xbox 360, the home game console by Microsoft.

Concerns and controversies

IVI streaming is not working on a number of Linux platforms, even though it is not stipulated in the User agreement. IVI does not offer reimbursement for users who intended to use their service in browsers on Linux, rather suggesting switching to another operating system.

Owners and management
ivi.ru is owned by Leonid Boguslavsky's company ru-Net, international technology investment fund Tiger Group, independent private equity firm Baring Vostok, media holding ProfMedia, Oleg Tumanov, founder and CEO, and  Frontier Ventures, a venture fund founded by Dmitry Alimov.

References

External links

 www.myfreesoft.ru — review of free Internet-theatre ivi.ru

Video on demand services
Russian entertainment websites